8441 Lapponica, provisional designation , is a background asteroid from the Florian region of the inner asteroid belt, approximately  in diameter. It was discovered on 16 October 1977, by Ingrid and Cornelis van Houten at Leiden, and Tom Gehrels at Palomar Observatory in California. The L-type asteroid has a rotation period of 3.27 hours. It was named for the Bar-tailed godwit, a shorebird also known by its Latin name Limosa lapponica.

Orbit and classification 

Lapponica is a non-family asteroid of the main belt's background population when applying the hierarchical clustering method to its proper orbital elements. Based on osculating Keplerian orbital elements, the asteroid has also been classified as a member of the Flora family, a giant asteroid family and the largest family of stony asteroids in the main-belt.

The asteroid orbits the Sun in the inner main-belt at a distance of 1.9–2.5 AU once every 3 years and 3 months (1,184 days; semi-major axis of 2.19 AU). Its orbit has an eccentricity of 0.14 and an inclination of 5° with respect to the ecliptic.

Palomar–Leiden Trojan survey 

The survey designation "T-3" stands for the third Palomar–Leiden Trojan survey, named after the fruitful collaboration of the Palomar and Leiden Observatory in the 1960s and 1970s. Gehrels used Palomar's Samuel Oschin telescope (also known as the 48-inch Schmidt Telescope), and shipped the photographic plates to Ingrid and Cornelis van Houten at Leiden Observatory where astrometry was carried out. The trio are credited with the discovery of several thousand asteroid discoveries.

Physical characteristics 

Lapponica has been characterized as an L-type asteroid in the SDSS-based taxonomy and by Pan-STARRS survey. It is also an assumed S-type asteroid.

Rotation period 

In 2008, two rotational lightcurves of Lapponica were obtained from photometric observations by French amateur astronomer Pierre Antonini and by Maurice Clark at the Montgomery College Observatory in Maryland. Analysis of the best-rated lightcurve gave a rotation period of 3.27 hours with a consolidated brightness amplitude between 0.29 and 0.50 magnitude.

Diameter and albedo 

The Collaborative Asteroid Lightcurve Link assumes an albedo of 0.24 – derived from 8 Flora, the parent body of the Flora family – and calculates a diameter of 4.50 kilometers based on an absolute magnitude of 13.9.

Naming 

This minor planet was named for the bar-tailed godwit (Limosa lapponica) a migratory bird of the family Scolopacidae. The official naming citation was published by the Minor Planet Center on 2 February 1999 and revised on 2 April 1999.

References

External links 
 Asteroid Lightcurve Database (LCDB), query form (info )
 Dictionary of Minor Planet Names, Google books
 Asteroids and comets rotation curves, CdR – Observatoire de Genève, Raoul Behrend
 Discovery Circumstances: Numbered Minor Planets (5001)-(10000) – Minor Planet Center
 
 

008441
Discoveries by Cornelis Johannes van Houten
Discoveries by Ingrid van Houten-Groeneveld
Discoveries by Tom Gehrels
4008
Named minor planets
19771016